Anaeroarcus burkinensis  is a Gram-negative, strictly anaerobic bacterium from the genus of Anaeroarcus which has been isolated from soil from a rice field in Burkina Faso in Africa. Anaeroarcus burkinensis uses lactate as only source of carbon.

References

External links
Type strain of Anaeroarcus burkinensis at BacDive -  the Bacterial Diversity Metadatabase	

Negativicutes
Bacteria described in 1992